John Dempster may refer to:

Jocky Dempster, John 'Jocky' Dempster, Scottish footballer who played in the 1970s for Queen of the South F.C. and had short spells with St. Mirren and Clyde F.C.
John Dempster (footballer), footballer playing in the 21st century for Rushden and Diamonds, Oxford United and Kettering Town
John Dempster (Medal of Honor), American Civil War sailor who received the Medal of Honor
John Dempster (organist) (1885–1942), organist and choirmaster in Adelaide, South Australia